GTE Federal Credit Union, doing business as GTE Financial, is an American credit union, headquartered in Tampa, Florida, and chartered and regulated under the authority of the National Credit Union Administration (NCUA). As of March 31, 2018, GTE had 262,538 members.

The organization was founded in 1935 as the Peninsular Telephone Employees Credit Union to serve the employees of Peninsular Telephone Company. After Peninsular became part of GTE (since merged with Verizon), the credit union was renamed GTE Federal Credit Union in 1958. Effective August 2012, the credit union rebranded itself as GTE Financial to reflect its status as a full-service financial institution.

References

External links
 

Banks established in 1935
Companies based in Tampa, Florida
Credit unions based in Florida
Verizon Communications
1935 establishments in Florida